Like all municipalities of Puerto Rico, Loíza is subdivided into administrative units called barrios, which are roughly comparable to minor civil divisions, (and means wards or boroughs or neighborhoods in English). The barrios and subbarrios, in turn, are further subdivided into smaller local populated place areas/units called sectores (sectors in English). The types of sectores may vary, from normally sector to urbanización to reparto to barriada to residencial, among others. Some sectors appear in two barrios.

List of sectors by barrio

Canóvanas
Apartamentos River Oak Villas
Camino Los Peñas
Égida Emannuel de Marrero Inc.
Extensión Villas de Loíza
Sector Palmarejo
Urbanización Country View
Urbanización Loíza Estates
Urbanización Villas de Loíza

Loíza barrio-pueblo

Las Cuevas (Carreteras 187, 951, 957)
Loíza Home For The Elderly
Residencial Brisas de Loíza
Residencial Jardines de Loíza
Residencial San Patricio
Residencial Yuquiyú
Sector Hacienda Grande (Villa Álvarez, Villa Vaca)
Sector La Planta
Sector Los Plaza
Sector Los Salgado
Sector Villa Cañona
Sector Villa Cañona II
Urbanización Jardines de Loíza
Urbanización Santiago (Villa Repollo)

Medianía Alta
Comunidad Los Sánchez
Condominio Costa Mar West
Condominio Villa del Mar Beach Resort
Costa Mar Apartments
El Ceiba
Melilla
Miñi Miñi
Parcelas Vieques
Pueblo del Niño
Sector Colobó
Sector El Parrilla
Sector Las Carreras
Sector Los Calcaño
Sector Los Vizcarrondo
Sector Villa Batata
Sector Villa Colobó
Sector Villa Cristiana
Tocones
Urbanización El Portal
Urbanización Villa Miñi Miñe
Villa Batata
Villa Mosquito
Villa Santos
Villa Toledo

Medianía Baja
Apartamentos Loíza Gardens
Callejón Los Millonarios
Carretera 187
Comunidad Pompeya
Comunidad Zapatería Pizarro
Condominio Ocean Point
Égida La Providencia
El Martillo
El Mamey
Honduras
La Gallera
Malibu Apartments
Parcelas Suárez
Sector El Trompo
Sector Jobos
Sector La 23
Sector Los Boria
Sector Los Parrilla
Sector Richard
Sector Villa del Carmen
Sector Villa Kennedy
Urbanización El Cabo
Urbanización Estancias del Río
Urbanización Palmarena
Urbanización Santiago Apóstol
Urbanización Santillana del Mar
Urbanización Vista del Océano

Torrecilla Alta
There are no sectors in Torrecilla Alta barrio.

Torrecilla Baja
Sector El Terraplén
Sector La Arena
Sector La Torre
Sector Las Pajita
Sector Los Vizcarrondo
Sector Monte Grande
Sector Piñones
Sector Punta Maldonado

See also

 List of communities in Puerto Rico

References

Loíza
Loíza